Lyuben Popov (born 25 October 1954) is a Bulgarian sports shooter. He competed in the mixed 50 metre free pistol event at the 1980 Summer Olympics.

References

External links
 

1954 births
Living people
Bulgarian male sport shooters
Olympic shooters of Bulgaria
Shooters at the 1980 Summer Olympics
Place of birth missing (living people)
20th-century Bulgarian people